Schendyla is a genus of centipedes in the family Schendylidae. It was described by Danish entomologists Vilhelm Bergsøe and Frederik Vilhelm August Meinert in 1866. Centipedes in this genus range from 1 cm to 4 cm in length and have from 31 to 57 pairs of legs.

Species
There are 21 valid species:

 Schendyla apenninorum (Brölemann & Ribaut, 1911)
 Schendyla armata Brölemann, 1901
 Schendyla aternana (Verhoeff, 1934)
 Schendyla capusei (Dărăbanţu & Matic, 1969)
 Schendyla carniolensis Verhoeff, 1902
 Schendyla dalmatica Attems, 1904
 Schendyla delicatula Kaczmarek, 1969
 Schendyla dentata (Brölemann & Ribaut, 1911)
 Schendyla gracillima Verhoeff, 1934
 Schendyla hispanica (Attems, 1952)
 Schendyla mediterranea Silvestri, 1898
 Schendyla monodi (Brölemann, 1924)
 Schendyla monoeci Brölemann, 1904
 Schendyla negreai (Dărăbanţu & Matic, 1969)
 Schendyla nemorensis (C.L.Koch, 1837)
 Schendyla peyerimhoffi Brölemann & Ribaut, 1911
 Schendyla tyrolensis (Meinert, 1870)
 Schendyla varnensis (Kaczmarek, 1969)
 Schendyla verneri (Folkmanová & Dobroruka, 1960)
 Schendyla vizzavonae Léger & Duboscq, 1903
 Schendyla walachica Verhoeff, 1900

References

 

 
 
Centipede genera
Animals described in 1996